Kocić is a Serbian surname. It may refer to:

Aleksandar Kocić (born 1969), Serbian former football goalkeeper
Milan Kocić (born 1990), Slovenian footballer
Miloš Kocić (born 1985), Serbian footballer who plays for Toronto FC in Major League Soccer
Mladen Kocić (born 1988), Serbian futsal player
Saša Kocić (born 1976), Serbian footballer who currently plays for FK Radnički Kragujevac

Serbian surnames